Al-Kufa Sports Club, is an Iraqi football team based in Kufa, Al-Najaf, that plays in Iraq Division One.

Managerial history 
  Adel Ali Al-Aasam
  Salman Hussein
  Maitham Jaber

See also 
 2019–20 Iraq FA Cup
 2021–22 Iraq FA Cup
 2022–23 Iraq FA Cup

References

External links 
 Al-Kufa SC on Goalzz.com
 Iraq Clubs- Foundation Dates

Football clubs in Najaf
Kufa